The Quinta de San Pedro Alejandrino is an hacienda or quinta built in the 17th century, famous for being the death place of Simón Bolívar on December 17, 1830.  The hacienda is located in the corregimiento of Mamatoco within the tourist district of Santa Marta, near the Caribbean sea in northern Colombia.

In Bolívar's time, the estate produced rum, honey and panela.
Nowadays it functions as a tourist site, museum and historical landmark. Simón Bolívar is considered one of the most influential people in the struggle for independence for South American countries including Colombia, Venezuela, Ecuador, Peru and Bolivia. This museum is considered a tourist site where others can come to honor his actions. There is a small entrance fee for the museum with a discount for children.

External links 
 Quinta de San Pedro Alejandrino (official web site)

Houses in Colombia
Museums in Colombia
Landmarks in Colombia
Monuments to Simón Bolívar
Santa Marta
Buildings and structures in Magdalena Department
Tourist attractions in Magdalena Department